Guddi is a 1971 Hindi drama film directed by Hrishikesh Mukherjee and written by Gulzar. It starred Dharmendra, Jaya Bachchan and Utpal Dutt. It is Jaya Bachchan (née Bhaduri)'s career-making film in which she plays a schoolgirl who has a crush on and is obsessed with the actor Dharmendra, who plays himself. She earned a Filmfare nomination as Best Actress, the only nomination for the film. Utpal Dutt also has a starring role. Many Bollywood actors like Rajesh Khanna, Naveen Nischol, Asrani, Amitabh Bachchan, Om Prakash and Pran gave guest appearances as themselves. According to Boxofficeindia.com, the film became a "big city hit" and did "above average" business everywhere else. It was later remade in Tamil as Cinema Paithiyam (1975) starring Jayachitra and Kamal Haasan.

Plot
Kusum (aka Guddi) is a spunky and carefree schoolgirl who lives with her father, brother and sister-in-law. Guddi has a crush on film star Dharmendra, whom she regards as a superman who can do no wrong, unable to distinguish between his on-screen image and the real person behind the star.

Nobody knows the extent of her crush until she visits Bombay, where her sister-in-law's brother Navin  proposes to her, only to be taken aback when Guddi discloses that she is in love with Dharmendra. Navin discusses the matter with his uncle, who decides that the only solution is to make Guddi realise the difference between illusion and reality.

The uncle contacts Dharmendra through a mutual friend. With his help, they show Guddi the difference between the real world and the make-believe world of cinema. Exposed for the first time to the grime and the cruel and heartless world behind the glamour of cinema, Guddi realises that nothing is true in the reel world. While her respect for Dharmendra grows, Guddi comes to realise that he is just as human as anyone around and lives with the same fears and insecurities as anyone else.

The film ends with Guddi agreeing to marry Navin.

Cast
Jaya Bachchan as Guddi/Kusum
Dharmendra as himself
Sumita Sanyal as Bhabhi
Utpal Dutt as Professor Gupta
Samit Bhanja as  Navin
A.K. Hangal as Guddi's father
Asrani as Kundan
Keshto Mukherjee as Kader Bhai
Vijay Sharma as Kishan
Lalita Kumari as teacher
Aarti as Tara

The film featured cameos from actors and industry figures including (in order of appearance):

 Pran
 Rajesh Khanna
 Vinod Khanna
 Ashok Kumar
 Dilip Kumar
 Naveen Nischol
 Amitabh Bachchan 
 Mala Sinha
 Biswajeet
 Hrishikesh Mukherjee (As a director)
 Om Prakash
 Vimi
 Shashikala
 Shatrughan Sinha
 Deven Verma

Soundtrack

Awards and nominations

|-
| 1972
| Jaya Bhaduri
| Filmfare Award for Best Actress
| 
|}

References

External links

1970s Hindi-language films
1971 comedy-drama films
Indian comedy-drama films
1971 films
Films directed by Hrishikesh Mukherjee
Hindi films remade in other languages
Films scored by Vasant Desai
Films with screenplays by Gulzar
Films about Bollywood
Cultural depictions of Amitabh Bachchan
Cultural depictions of Rajesh Khanna
Cultural depictions of actors